Malcolm Daniel Graham (July 6, 1827 – October 6, 1878) was a Confederate politician.

Life
He was born in Autauga County, Alabama and later moved to Texas. He served in the Texas State Senate in 1857 and as Attorney General from 1858 to 1860. He was a delegate to the Texas Secession Convention and was signer of the Ordinance of Secession. He represented the state in the First Confederate Congress from 1862 to 1864. He also served as a colonel in the Confederate Army.

He was married to Sarah Cornelia Bethea. He is buried in Oakwood Cemetery in Montgomery, Alabama.

He had a son, named Malcolm A. Graham, who served in the Alabama House of Representatives in the late 1910s.

References

1827 births
1878 deaths
Texas state senators
Members of the Confederate House of Representatives from Texas
19th-century American politicians
Texas Attorneys General
Confederate States Army officers